A stealth ship is a ship that employs stealth technology construction techniques in an effort to make it harder to detect by one or more of radar, visual, sonar, and infrared methods.

These techniques borrow from stealth aircraft technology, although some aspects such as wake and acoustic signature reduction (acoustic quieting) are unique to stealth ships' design. Although radar cross-section (RCS) reduction is a fairly new concept, many other forms of masking a ship have existed for centuries or even millennia.

Shaping

In designing a ship with a reduced radar signature, the main concerns are radar beams originating near or slightly above the horizon (as seen from the ship) coming from distant patrol aircraft, other ships, or sea-skimming anti-ship missiles with active radar seekers. Therefore, the shape of the ship avoids vertical surfaces, which are effective at reflecting such beams directly back to the emitter. Retro-reflective right angles are eliminated to avoid the cat's eye effect. A stealthy ship shape can be achieved by constructing the hull and superstructure with a series of slightly protruding and retruding surfaces. Furthermore, round shapes on the ship are eliminated or covered up, examples being smokestacks and gun turrets. Also, cavities that present a horizontal face are to be eliminated since they are very visible to radar. To bypass these limitations, many ships use features such as panels that cover reflective surfaces or use alternate designs of hardware. Additionally, efforts are made to minimize gaps on the ship. Hull shapes include tumblehome hull designs, which slope inward from the waterline, and small-waterplane-area twin hulls (SWATH), which allow for better stability when using a tumblehome hull. These RCS design principles were developed by several navies independently in the 1980s using work done on aircraft RCS reduction as the starting point.

Sea Shadow, which utilizes both tumblehome and SWATH features, was an early US exploration of stealth ship technology. The currently-serving Zumwalt-class destroyer is a modern example of a stealth ship from the US Navy. The tumblehome hull and composite material deckhouse reduce radar return. Water sleeting along the sides, along with passive cool air induction in the mack, reduces infrared signature. Overall, the destroyer's angular build makes it "50 times harder to spot on radar than an ordinary destroyer", according to Chris Johnson, a spokesman for Naval Sea Systems Command.

The Swedish Navy's Visby-class corvette is designed to elude visual detection, radar detection, acoustic detection, and infrared detection. The hull material is a sandwich construction comprising a PVC core with carbon fiber and vinyl laminate. Avoidance of right angles in the design results in a smaller radar signature, reducing the ship's detection range.

The Royal Navy's Type 45 destroyer has similarities to the Visby class, but is much more conventional, employing traditional steel instead of carbon fiber. Like Visby, its design reduces the use of right angles.

The ROC Navy's Tuo Chiang-class corvette is a class of fast stealth multi-mission corvettes currently in service with the Republic of China (Taiwan) Navy. The ships are designed to have a low radar cross-section and evade radar detection making it difficult to detect the ship when operating closer to the coastline

Signature reduction
Stealth technology represents more than just a low RCS; noise reduction plays a role in naval stealth because sound is conducted better in water than air. Some of the techniques used include muffled exhaust systems, modified propeller shapes, and pump-jets. The shape of the hull can also have a great effect on the reduction of the noise from a ship. Another major element is signal emission control. Modern warships emit much electromagnetic radiation in the form of radar, radio, and bleed-off from the ship's electrical systems. These all can be used to track a ship, and thus modern stealth ships often have a mode that switches off many of the electronic emissions (EMCON), the downside being the ship has to rely on passive sensors and is unable to easily send messages further than the line of sight.

Also of importance are thermal emissions. A heat signature can make a ship stand out in the ocean, making it easier to spot. Because it is possible to see infrared emissions through features that would normally hide a ship such as fog, or a smoke screen, many detection platforms like patrol aircraft, UAVs, and satellites often have the ability to see multiple bands in the infrared spectrum. This necessitates the control of thermal emissions. The most common method is to mix any hot gasses emitted by the main source of heat—the engines' exhaust—with cold air to dilute the signature and make it harder to pick out the ship from the background warmth. Another method vents the exhaust into the water, although this increases the ship's acoustic signature. For the hull, cool water can be actively distributed across the hull of the ship. Another less crucial but still relevant part of a stealth ship is visual camouflage. This area is probably the oldest form of stealth, with records going back almost as far as the writing of ancient mariners using visual tricks to make their ships harder to spot. Although still relevant, this area has taken on lesser importance with the advent of long-range radar.

Materials
Just like choices in shaping, the choice of materials affects the RCS of a ship. Composites like fiberglass and carbon fiber are effective blockers of radar and give smaller vessels an advantage in further RCS reductions. However, composites are fragile and often unsuited to larger ships or ships that expect to take fire, although new laminates can partially negate some of the weaknesses. This restricts larger ships to metals like steel and aluminum alloys. To compensate, a ship may include a coating of a radar-absorbing material, although this can be expensive and may not stand up to the corrosive effects of salt water.

Examples

Fully stealth ships
(Year of commission)

  (1985, experimental platform)
  (1996)
  (1998)
  (1999)
  (2004)
  (2007)
  (2009)
  fast attack craft (2010)
  (2010)
  (2011)
  (2014)
  (2016)
  (2017)
  (2020)

Ships with moderate radar cross-section reduction

Reduced radar cross-section ships

 
 
 
 
 
 
 
 
 
 
 
 
 
 
  (KDX-III)
  (KDX-II)

Planned ships

Gallery

References

External links
 "Stealth on the Water" "Mechanical Engineering"
Taiwanese navy showcases new killer stealth corvette
Taiwan launches its largest ever stealth missile ship
Taiwan stealth technology breakthrough
Taiwan navy stealth missile warship corvette
Taiwan navy launches new stealth boat
Taiwan navy testing stealth frigates
DDG 1000 information; formerly DD(X)
Shivalik class frigate
Stealth ships steam ahead article by Chris Summers on BBC news, 10 June 2004

 
Naval warfare
Radar
Ship types